"Music of My Heart" is a song by Cuban American recording artist Gloria Estefan and American boy band NSYNC. The teen pop song was written by Diane Warren and produced by David Foster, for the Wes Craven-directed movie Music of the Heart (1999). It was released as the first single from the soundtrack on August 2, 1999, through Miramax Records and Epic Records.

The song peaked at number two on the Billboard Hot 100 in 1999, becoming Estefan's 11th and last top 10 hit. It was listed on the Billboard year-end chart at number 97. The single was certified Gold by the RIAA in the United States for sales of 500,000 copies. "Music of My Heart" won the Billboard Music Award for Top Song from a Movie, and the Blockbuster Award for Best Pop Song in a Movie. It was also nominated for an Academy Award for Best Original Song, as well as Grammy Awards for Best Song Written for a Motion Picture and Best Pop Collaboration with Vocals.

Background and composition
"Music of My Heart" was written by Diane Warren and produced by David Foster, for the Wes Craven-directed movie Music of the Heart (1999). Gloria Estefan and band NSYNC recorded their vocals for the song in 1999. It was released as the first single from the movie soundtrack on September 28, 1999. The song was originally offered to rival group the Backstreet Boys, but originally rejected, and was offered to NSYNC instead. "Music of My Heart" is a teen pop song that lasts for four minutes and thirty-one seconds. The song is composed in the key of B major later changing to the key of D-flat major and is set in time signature of common time, with a moderately slow tempo of 68 beats per minute. According to the sheet music published at Musicnotes.com by Universal Music Publishing Group, the vocal range of Estefan and the members of NSYNC spans over an octave, from F4 to B and late D-flat 5. 5.

Music video
The video, directed by Nigel Dick, features NSYNC and Gloria Estefan singing in Miami High School in Miami with interspersed shots of student musicians.

Track listings

US and European CD1
 "Music of My Heart" (album version) – 4:31
 "Music of My Heart" (Hex Hector 7-inch remix) – 4:18

US and European CD2
 "Music of My Heart" (album version) – 4:31
 "Music of My Heart" (Pablo Flores club mix) – 10:06
 "Music of My Heart" (Pablo Flores radio edit) – 4:42

UK CD1
 "Music of My Heart" (album version) – 4:31
 "Music of My Heart" (Lawrence Dermer Remix) – 4:21
 "Music of My Heart" (Hex Hector 12-inch club mix) – 9:20

UK CD2
 "Music of My Heart" (album version) – 4:31
 "Music of My Heart" (Hex Hector 7-inch radio edit) – 4:18
 "Music of My Heart" (Pablo Flores club mix) – 10:06

Charts

Weekly charts

Year-end charts

Certifications

|}

Release history

References

1990s ballads
1999 singles
1999 songs
Epic Records singles
Gloria Estefan songs
Male–female vocal duets
NSYNC songs
Pop ballads
Song recordings produced by David Foster
Songs about music
Songs written by Diane Warren
Songs written for films